Helen Carruthers (1892–1925) was an American actress of the silent film era. Carruthers is best known for her work in Keystone comedies.

Career 
Carruther's career in film began in 1914. That year she appeared in no less than 35 Keystone comedies, 17 of which were with Charlie Chaplin. Her screen debut was in the Chaplin comedy His Favourite Pastime, and her last credited work for Keystone was as Chaplin's love interest and the king's wife in His Prehistoric Past. The absence of any credits in Carruther's available filmographies after 1914 suggests that her short motion-picture career ended by 1915.

Personal life 

In May 1915, at age 23, Carruthers attempted suicide by swallowing 30 mercury bichloride tablets. She survived, but the poisonous compound severely damaged her kidneys.

Carruthers married Baron Fransiscus Gerard Zur Muehlen, a Javanese sugar merchant who was attached to the Dutch diplomatic service, in 1918.

On July 7, 1925, while hosting a gathering in her hotel room at the Ritz Carlton, Carruthers opened a window to let a breeze in and she fell from the seventh story. The coroner ruled her death an accident.

Filmography

References

External links

1892 births
1925 deaths
Burials at Woodlawn Cemetery (Bronx, New York)
American silent film actresses
Place of birth missing
20th-century American actresses